Marjet Van Puymbroeck (28 March 1921 – 21 May 2018) was a Belgian politician, who was a member of both the Senate and the Flemish Parliament between 1981 and 1987.

References

1921 births
2018 deaths
Belgian politicians
Members of the Senate (Belgium)
Members of the Flemish Parliament
Politicians from Antwerp